Admiral Stewart may refer to:

Alexander Stewart, Duke of Albany (c. 1454–1485), Lord High Admiral of Scotland
Charles Stewart (American Navy officer) (1778–1869), U.S. Navy rear admiral
Charles Stewart (Royal Navy officer) (1681–1741), British Royal Navy vice admiral
Charles Stewart, 3rd Duke of Richmond (1639–1672), Great Admiral of Scotland
Francis Stewart, 5th Earl of Bothwell (c. 1562–1612), Lord High Admiral of Scotland
George Stewart, 8th Earl of Galloway (1768–1834), British Royal Navy admiral
Houston Stewart (1791–1875), British Royal Navy admiral
James Stewart, 1st Duke of Richmond (1612–1655), Lord High Admiral of Scotland
James P. Stewart (1924–2019), U.S. Coast Guard vice admiral
Keith Stewart (1739–1795), British Royal Navy vice admiral
Keith Stewart (1814-1879), British Royal Navy Admiral
William Houston Stewart (1822–1901), British Royal Navy admiral

See also
James Steuart (Royal Navy officer) (1678–1757), British Royal Navy admiral
Charles Gage Stuart (1887–1970), British Royal Navy rear admiral
Lord George Stuart (1780–1841), British Royal Navy rear admiral